In enzymology, a formate dehydrogenase (cytochrome-c-553) is an enzyme that catalyzes the chemical reaction

formate + ferricytochrome c-553  CO2 + ferrocytochrome c-553

Thus, the two substrates of this enzyme are formate and ferricytochrome c-553, whereas its two products are CO2 and ferrocytochrome c-553.

This enzyme belongs to the family of oxidoreductases, specifically those acting on the aldehyde or oxo group of donor with a cytochrome as acceptor.  The systematic name of this enzyme class is formate:ferricytochrome-c-553 oxidoreductase.

References 

 
 

EC 1.2.2
Enzymes of unknown structure